Reka is a settlement on the Idrijca River in the Municipality of Cerkno in the traditional Littoral region of Slovenia.

The local church is dedicated to Saint Cantius and belongs to the Parish of Cerkno.

References

External links

Reka on Geopedia

Populated places in the Municipality of Cerkno